Rajampeta revenue division (or Rajampeta division) is an administrative division in the Annamayya district of the Indian state of Andhra Pradesh. It is one of the three revenue divisions in the district which consists of 9 mandals under its administration. Rajampeta is the administrative headquarters of the division.

Administration 
The 9 mandals in division are:.

History

See also 
List of revenue divisions in Andhra Pradesh
List of mandals in Andhra Pradesh

References 

Revenue divisions in Kadapa district
Revenue divisions in Andhra Pradesh